This is a list of diplomatic missions in the U.S. state of New Jersey. A number of foreign governments have established diplomatic and trade representation through resident consulates, honorary consulates, and other types of establishments.

For other diplomatic missions in the United States, see List of diplomatic missions in the United States.

Consulates and Consulates General
All resident consulates in New Jersey are located in the northeastern region of the state.

 Colombia, 550 Broad Street, Newark
 Dominican Republic, 152 Market Street, Paterson
 Ecuador, 400 Market Street, Newark
 El Salvador, 40 Parker Road, Elizabeth
 Peru, 100 Hamilton Plaza, Paterson
 Portugal, 1 Riverfront Plaza, Newark

Honorary Consulates

 Finland (Bedminster)
 France (Princeton)
 Republic of Georgia (Jersey City)
 Haiti (Trenton)
 Kyrgyzstan (South Plainfield)
 North Macedonia (Clifton)
 Spain (Newark)
 Sri Lanka (Newark)

Missions/Representative Offices

 Canada Trade Office (Princeton)

Diplomatic missions
New Jersey